Events that happened in the year 1838 in Portugal.

Incumbents
Monarch: Mary II
Prime Minister: Bernardo de Sá Nogueira de Figueiredo, 1st Marquis of Sá da Bandeira

Events

Arts and entertainment

Sports

Births
31 October – Luís I of Portugal, king (died 1889)

Deaths

11 December — Francisco Manuel Trigoso, politician (b. 1777).

References

 
1830s in Portugal
Portugal
Years of the 19th century in Portugal
Portugal